Music for Millions is a 1944 musical comedy film directed by Henry Koster and starring Margaret O'Brien, José Iturbi, Jimmy Durante, June Allyson, Marsha Hunt, Hugh Herbert, Harry Davenport, and Marie Wilson. It was nominated for an Oscar for Best Original Screenplay in 1946.

Plot
"Mike", age 6, arrives in New York to stay with her pregnant older sister Barbara Ainsworth, who lives together with a group of young women, her co-players in a symphony orchestra. As the orchestra prepares to go on a tour of army camps, a telegram is received informing them of the death of Barbara's soldier husband in the Pacific war theater. The girls decide to keep the tragic news from her until after her baby is born. The orchestra is shown playing several classical standards before various military audiences. The talented Iturbi variously conducts the group as well as effortlessly plays difficult piano pieces, while Durante sings comically and acts as a grandfather figure to Mike. In a surprise ending, shortly before giving birth, Barbara receives a letter from her husband saying he is in good spirits and convalescing in a military hospital.

Cast

Soundtrack
 Clair de Lune
 Music by Claude Debussy
 Performed by Larry Adler on harmonica
 Also performed by José Iturbi on piano
 Antonín Dvořák's Symphony No. 9 in E minor, 4th movement, conducted by José Iturbi
 Piano Concerto in A Minor
 Music by Edvard Grieg
 Performed by José Iturbi
 The March of the Toys
 from Babes in Toyland
 Music by Victor Herbert
 Waltz in E Minor
 Music by Frédéric Chopin
 Performed by José Iturbi
 Hallelujah Chorus
 from The Messiah
 Music by Georg Friedrich Händel
 Toscanini, Iturbi and Me
 Written by Harold Spina, Walter Bullock and Jimmy Durante
 At Sundown
 Written by Walter Donaldson
 Umbriago
 Written by Jimmy Durante and Irving Caesar
 Jam Session
 Music by Calvin Jackson

Reception
According to MGM records, the film earned $2,341,000 in the US and Canada and $1,504,000 elsewhere, resulting in a profit of $824,000.

References

External links

 
 
 
 

1944 films
1940s musical comedy-drama films
American musical comedy-drama films
American black-and-white films
1940s English-language films
Films directed by Henry Koster
Metro-Goldwyn-Mayer films
Films produced by Joe Pasternak
Films scored by Michel Michelet
1944 comedy films
1944 drama films
1940s American films